Molade is an African given name. Notable people with the name include:

Augustus Molade Akiwumi (1891–1985), Ghanaian lawyer and politician
Molade Okoya-Thomas (1935–2015), Nigerian businessman

See also
Omolade

African given names